Gorda may refer to:

 Gorda, California, United States, a small town on the Pacific Ocean
 Gorda Plate, a tectonic plate located beneath the Pacific Ocean near northern California
 Cayo Gorda, a small island of Honduras in Caribbean Sea
 Gorda, fat in Spanish and Portuguese